Ángel Meider Chourio (born 4 May 1985) is a Venezuelan footballer. He is an attacking midfielder and he currently plays for Aragua.

International career
Chourio has played 19 times for the Venezuela national football team, where he has scored 5 goals.

International goals
Scores and results list Venezuela's goal tally first.

References
http://liderendeportes.com article Chourio crack numbers in 'La Vinotinto' (in Spanish)

Notes

External links

1985 births
Living people
Sportspeople from Maracay
Venezuelan footballers
Venezuela international footballers
Venezuelan Primera División players
Trujillanos FC players
Aragua FC players
UA Maracaibo players
Deportivo Italia players
Real Esppor Club players
Deportivo Táchira F.C. players
A.C.C.D. Mineros de Guayana players
Association football midfielders